Ashok Kumar Mittal, (born 10 September 1964) is an Indian businessman and educationalist turned politician. He is a member of parliament in India's upper house, Rajya Sabha. Mittal is also the chancellor of Lovely Professional University.

Mittal joined active politics after 2022 Punjab election, when he was nominated by Aam Aadmi Party for the Rajya Sabha. No opposition candidate opposed his election.

Mittal is law graduate from Guru Nanak Dev University.

References

Further reading
  
 

 

Living people
People from Punjab, India
Indian lawyers
Aam Aadmi Party politicians from Punjab, India
Rajya Sabha members from Aam Aadmi Party
1964 births